Gene Allen may refer to:

Gene Allen (art director) (1918–2015), American art director
Eugene Allen (1919–2010), White House butler
Gene Allen (musician) (1928–2008), American jazz musician